Nigel Paul may refer to:

 Nigel Paul (cricketer) (born 1933), English cricketer
 Nigel Paul (boxer) (born 1989), boxer from Trinidad and Tobago